The Central Indian leaf-toed gecko (Hemidactylus chipkali) is a species of gecko. It is endemic to Madhya Pradesh in India.

References

Hemidactylus
Reptiles described in 2017
Endemic fauna of India
Reptiles of India